Road to Moscow is a 1984 video game published by Ba'rac Limited.

Gameplay
Road to Moscow is a game in which the Russian Front of World War II is simulated in a strategic level game.

Reception
Bill Wise reviewed the game for Computer Gaming World, and stated that "The combination of ease of play, interesting scenarios, an excellent game system, and numerous strategic options will keep me playing RTM for a long time to come."

References

External links
Review in Compute!'s Gazette
Review in Commodore Power/Play

1984 video games
Commodore 64 games
Commodore 64-only games
Computer wargames
Turn-based strategy video games
Video games about Nazi Germany
Video games developed in the United States
Video games set in the Soviet Union
World War II video games